Abu Nasri Mansur ibn Ali ibn Iraq al-Jaʿdī (c. 960 – 1036) was a Persian Muslim mathematician and astronomer. He is well known for his work with the spherical sine law.

Abu Nasr Mansur was born in Gilan, Persia, to the ruling family of Khwarezm, the Afrighids. He was thus a prince within the political sphere. He was a student of Abu'l-Wafa and a teacher of and also an important colleague of the mathematician, Al-Biruni. Together, they were responsible for great discoveries in mathematics and dedicated many works to one another.

Most of Abu Nasri's work focused on math, but some of his writings were on astronomy.  In mathematics, he had many important writings on trigonometry, which were developed from the writings of Ptolemy. He also preserved the writings of Menelaus of Alexandria and reworked many of the Greeks theorems.

He died in the Ghaznavid Empire (modern-day Afghanistan) near the city of Ghazna.

References

Further reading
  (PDF version)

External links
 Digitized manuscript - Folios 8A-12A, Sprenger 1876 (Berlin State Library)

10th-century Iranian mathematicians
960s births
1036 deaths
Scientists who worked on qibla determination
10th-century Iranian astronomers
11th-century Iranian astronomers
Astronomers of the medieval Islamic world
Ghaznavid scholars
People from Gilan Province